Pseudhammus vittatus is a species of beetle in the family Cerambycidae. It was described by Per Olof Christopher Aurivillius in 1927.

Subspecies
 Pseudhammus vittatus frontalis Dillon & Dillon, 1959
 Pseudhammus vittatus vittatus Aurivillius, 1927

References

vittatus
Beetles described in 1927